Miss Provence is a French beauty pageant which selects a representative for the Miss France national competition from the departments of Alpes-de-Haute-Provence, Bouches-du-Rhône, Hautes-Alpes, Vaucluse, and portions of Var in the region of Provence-Alpes-Côte d'Azur (PACA). The other regional pageant within PACA is Miss Côte d'Azur, which selects a representative from the department of Alpes-Maritimes and the remaining portions of Var. The first Miss Provence was crowned in 1986, although women from the region have competed at Miss France with other titles since 1976.

The current Miss Provence is Chana Goyons, who was crowned Miss Provence 2022 on 29 July 2022. One woman from Provence has been crowned Miss France:
Sylvie Paréra, who was crowned Miss France 1979, competing as Miss Marseille

Results summary
Miss France: Sylvie Paréra (1978; Miss Marseille)
1st Runner-Up: Tatiana Bouguer (1999); Lou Ruat (2019); April Benayoum (2020)
2nd Runner-Up: Laëtizia Penmellen (2013)
3rd Runner-Up: Jennifer Willey (1998); Émilie Corbi (2009); Solène Froment (2011); Julia Courtès (2015)
5th Runner-Up: Brigitte Hermelin (1976; Miss Marseille); Analisa Kebaili (2010); Wynona Gueraini (2018)
Top 12/Top 15: Pascale Delzenne (1996); Lætitia Duffaux (2001); Lydia Podossenoff (2005); Marine Mahiques (2012); Anne-Laure Fourmont (2014); Kleofina Pnishi (2017)

Titleholders

Miss Marseille
From 1976 until 1978, Marseille, the largest city in Provence, crowned its own representative as Miss Marseille. The city was absorbed into Miss Provence following the establishment of Miss Provence in 1986.

Miss Côte Bleue
In 1990 and 1991, the department of Bouches-du-Rhône crowned its own representative as Miss Côte Bleue, although the department was reabsorbed into Miss Provence in 1992.

Miss Comtat Venaissin
In 1986, the department of Vaucluse crowned its own representative as Miss Comtat Venaissin, although the department was absorbed into Miss Provence the following year.

Notes

References

External links

Miss France regional pageants
Beauty pageants in France
Women in France